Castells is a Catalan surname. Notable people with the surname include:

Berta Castells (born 1984), Spanish hammer thrower
Manuel Castells, Spanish sociologist
Raúl Castells, Argentine leftist activist
Toni Castells, Spanish composer

Catalan-language surnames